The 2014–15 San Jose State Spartans men's basketball team represented San José State University during the 2014–15 NCAA Division I men's basketball season. The Spartans, led by second year head coach Dave Wojcik, played their home games at the Event Center Arena and were members of the Mountain West Conference.

Due to APR penalties, San Jose State were ineligible for postseason tournament play, including the Mountain West tournament.

Following a 7–24 season in 2013–14, the Spartans finished the season 2–28, 0–18 in Mountain West play to finish in last place. They failed to defeat a Division I opponent.

Preseason

Departures

Recruits

Incoming transfers

NCAA academic sanctions
Under previous head coach George Nessman, San Jose State reported five consecutive years of rising four-year average Academic Progress Rate (APR) scores, including a program-best 940 in the 2011–12 season (because of a perfect one-year 1000 score). However, the APR fell below 930 for the 2012–13 season, Nessman's last as head coach. As a result, the NCAA imposed sanctions on the San Jose State men's basketball program in April 2014. These sanctions included:
A postseason ban for this season, including from the MWC tournament;
Replacing four hours of basketball practice with four hours of academic activities;
One fewer day of basketball-related activities a week.

Athletic director Gene Bleymaier stated in response to the sanctions: "Last year, we were faced with a situation that needed to be dealt with in a major fashion. The coaching staff was not retained, and several players were not invited back for the 2013-14 season. Only four players returned from the 2012-13 team.

Roster

Suspensions and dismissals
Coach Dave Wojcik announced on December 13, 2014 that five players were suspended indefinitely due to violating team rules: Jordan Baker, Rashad Muhammad, Matt Pollard, Frank Rogers, and Jaleel Williams. As a result, two San Jose State football players—wide receiver Tyler Winston and tight end Andrew Vollert—joined the roster temporarily. Vollert and Winston became the first San Jose State football players since the 1988–89 season to have played football and basketball the same season. The last time that happened followed the walkout of 10 basketball players in protest over alleged verbal abuse by coach Bill Berry, who was fired after the season.

Five days after the five players were suspended, associate head coach Chris Brazelton was placed on paid administrative leave.  Ultimately, Muhammad and Williams were reinstated on January 3, 2015. Baker and Rogers were dismissed from the team, and Pollard transferred.

Injuries
On December 3, 2014, Jalen James suffered a season-ending ankle injury. Six days later, Leon Bahner was diagnosed with the same injury and was also sidelined the rest of the season. Devante Wilson did not play at all in the season due to injury.

Schedule

|-
!colspan=9 style="background:#005a8b; color:#c79900;"| Exhibition

|-
!colspan=9 style="background:#005a8b; color:#c79900;"| Regular season

References

San Jose State Spartans men's basketball seasons
San Jose State
San Jose State Spartans men's basketball
San Jose State Spartans men's basketball